Dr. Stone is a Japanese manga series written by Riichiro Inagaki and illustrated by Boichi. It was serialized in Weekly Shōnen Jump from March 6, 2017 to March 7, 2022. The individual chapters were collected and published by Shueisha into twenty-six tankōbon volumes . Viz Media licensed the manga in North America and the first volume was published in September 2018.


Volume list

References

External links
 

Dr. Stone